Adalric, Adalrich, Adelric, or Adelrich is a Germanic given name. Notable people with the name include:

 Athalaric (516–534), King of the Ostrogoths
 Adalrich, Duke of Alsace (died after 683)
 Adalric of Gascony, late 8th century lord
 Adalric, Bishop of Asti

See also
Ulrich

Masculine given names